Empis lutea is a species of fly in the family Empididae. It is included in the subgenus Xanthempis. It is found in the Palearctic.

References

External links
Images representing Empis at BOLD

Empis
Insects described in 1804
Asilomorph flies of Europe